Radio Musicola is the third studio album by English singer-songwriter Nik Kershaw, released on 24 October 1986 by MCA Records, just under two years after Kershaw's previous studio album, The Riddle (1984). It was the first studio album to be produced by Kershaw. It features guest backing vocalists, including Icehouse's Iva Davies, and Night's Stevie Lange, and Miriam Stockley.

The album was released to critical acclaim, but wasn't as successful as Kershaw's previous studio albums. It peaked at #47 on the UK Albums Chart, marking the beginning of a downturn in Kershaw's fortunes on the album charts. Four singles were issued from Radio Musicola: "When a Heart Beats", "Nobody Knows", "Radio Musicola", and "James Cagney", but none of them reached the Top 20, a first for Kershaw. However, Kershaw did find some minor success with the aforementioned single "When a Heart Beats" (which was not featured on the LP release, only on the cassette and CD versions of the album). The track "Running Scared" was dismissed as title track of the film Running Scared (1986). The album (to date) remains Kershaw's last album to make the Top 75, and was his last to receive a certification, being certified silver by the BPI.

After the original release, the album remained out of print on any format for many years. However, the album became available via online MP3 download on major sites such as Amazon, and iTunes.

Background
The album showcased Kershaw's frustration at the time, with subjects of integrity – media scepticism (particularly towards tabloid journalism), privacy, insecurity and mass-produced run-of-the-mill pop music ("Why can't you let us do it like Joni does it? There you go again, giving it your very best – trying so hard to make it sound like all the rest"). The subject is reflected in the cover artwork's concept. The LP record release featured 1950s style spoof advertisements with the song titles woven in, some of which were replicated in the compact disc's booklet.

Release and chart performance
The album's first single in the United Kingdom was "When a Heart Beats", which peaked at #27 upon its release, the first time that a lead single from a Kershaw album failed to hit the Top 20 in the UK. It became a bigger hit in Ireland, peaking at #14. Further singles from the album were "Nobody Knows" and the title track "Radio Musicola", which peaked at #44, and #43 respectively.
 
When Kershaw was asked about the poor sales of the album he said: "I didn't keep their attention – two albums in nine months was a stupid idea because the next one took two and a half years and a lot of people lost interest and went elsewhere, which is fair enough. And the music changed a little bit as well and I produced it myself so that might have been a reason."

Track listing

Personnel
Credits are adapted from the album's liner notes.

Musicians
 Nik Kershaw – lead and background vocals; guitars; keyboards; computers
 Andy Richards – keyboards; computers; Fairlight CMI programming
 Paul "Wix" Wickens – keyboards
 Tim Moore – keyboards
 Robin Cruikshank – keyboards
 Rupert Greenall – keyboards
 Simon Phillips – drums
 Mark Brzezicki – drums; drum programming
 Charlie Morgan – drums
 Mark Price – drums
 Steve Brzezicki – bass guitar
 Felix Krish – bass guitar
 Kuma Harada – bass guitar
 Dennis Smith – bass guitar
 Tim Sanders – saxophones
 Simon Clarke – saxophone; flute
 Roddy Lorimer – trumpet; flugelhorn
 Steve Sidwell – trumpet 
 Peter Thoms – trombone
 Gary Wallace – percussion
 Iva Davies – backing vocals
 Miriam Stockley – backing vocals
 Stevie Lange – backing vocals
 Sheri Kershaw – backing vocals
 Carol Kenyon – backing vocals
 Martin Taylor – backing vocals
 Gary Dyson – backing vocals

Production and artwork
 Nik Kershaw – producers
 Stuart Bruce – engineer; mixer
 Robin Cruikshank – assistant engineer 
 Ian Cooper – mastering
 Phil Warren – Model maker
 Richard Evans – Design and art direction
 Andrew Ellis – photography
 Icon – Artwork

Chart performance
Album

Certification

See also
 List of albums that were released in 1986
 Nik Kershaw's discography

References

External links
 
 Patrick Dailly: Taking Pop to pieces - "Life Goes On"

Nik Kershaw albums
1986 albums
MCA Records albums
Pop rock albums by English artists
Synth-pop albums by English artists